Aurora Project may refer to:

 Aurora Project, a fictional disease in the Blade: The Series
 Aurora programme, a human spaceflight programme of the European Space Agency
 Aurora (aircraft), a hypothesised United States reconnaissance aircraft